Valby station is an S-train and railway station in the Valby district of Copenhagen, Denmark. It is one of the most used stations, and hence regional trains also stop here. It is located in a highly populated area, where the Tåstrup and Frederikssund radials of the S-train network diverge, and is served by trains on or from either radial. All regional and some intercity trains also stop at Valby. Several express buses to Jutland terminate and depart from this station. There are two island platforms plus one track extra, for the S-trains towards Ballerup and (further out) Frederikssund. S-trains in direction to Copenhagen City Centre, Høje Taastrup and Ballerup/Frederikssond uses one track each. And regional trains (and a few other trains) uses the other platform, with its two tracks. All tracks are electrified, however some regional trains and
Inter City trains, do still in 2017 use diesel.

History
The first railway out of Copenhagen in 1847 had an intermediate station slightly east of where Valby station is today. The station was originally meant to serve mostly leisure trips to nearby Frederiksberg; it had a booming traffic in the railway's first years, which however dwindled as the novelty wore off. The station was closed in 1864 when the second main station in Copenhagen opened and the railway was displaced through Frederiksberg station instead.

In 1911 the current (third) central station was inaugurated almost at the site of the first one, and the railway moved back to its original alignment through Valby. The current station was built, this time as a junction between the railways to Roskilde and Frederikssund. Over the years the city had grown towards Valby, so the station now had a sizeable native passenger base.

On 1 November 1934, S-trains began running from central Copenhagen to a temporary platform at Valby east of Toftegårds Allé. When the inner part of Frederikssundbanen until Vanløse was electrified on 23 September 1941 the temporary platform closed and the S-trains now stopped at Valby station proper on their way to Vanløse.

In 1950–1953, the station was rebuilt once again with a grade-separated junction west of the platforms to join the S-train line towards Vanløse with the new line along Vestbanen, which was inaugurated on 17 June 1953.

References

External links

Railway stations in Valby
S-train (Copenhagen) stations
Railway stations in Copenhagen
Railway stations opened in 1911
Railway stations in Denmark opened in the 20th century